Goran Kulenović (born 1971) is a Croatian film director and screenwriter. He is best known for directing Play Me a Love Song.

Selected filmography

References

External links 

1971 births
Living people
Film people from Zagreb
Croatian film directors
Croatian screenwriters
Croatian people of Bosniak descent